In projective geometry, the Laguerre–Forsyth invariant is a cubic differential that is an invariant of a projective plane curve.  It is named for Edmond Laguerre and Andrew Forsyth, the latter of whom analyzed the invariant in an influential book on ordinary differential equations.

Suppose that  is a three-times continuously differentiable immersion of the projective line into the projective plane, with homogeneous coordinates given by  then associated to p is the third-order ordinary differential equation

Generically, this equation can be put into the form

where  are rational functions of the components of p and its derivatives.  After a change of variables of the form , this equation can be further reduced to an equation without first or second derivative terms

The invariant  is the Laguerre–Forsyth invariant.

The invariant  vanishes identically if (and only if) the curve is a conic section. Points where  vanishes are called the sextactic points of the curve. It is a theorem of Herglotz and Radon that every closed strictly convex curve has at least six sextactic points.

References
 
 

Projective geometry